Howrah is a city in [India.

Howrah (alternatively spelled Haora) may also refer to:

Topics related to Howrah, India

Administrative districts
 Howrah district, district of the state of West Bengal which contains the above city
 Howrah Sadar subdivision, a subdivision of the above district

Election districts
 Howrah (Lok Sabha constituency)
 Howrah Dakshin
 Howrah Madhya
 Howrah Uttar

Transport
 Howrah Bridge, a bridge connecting the city with Kolkata
 Howrah Junction railway station,  a major railway station of India, serving the cities of Howrah and Kolkata

Railway lines
 Howrah–Delhi main line
 Howrah–Bardhaman main line
 Howrah–Bardhaman chord
 Howrah–Allahabad–Mumbai line
 Howrah–Gaya–Delhi line
 Howrah–Kharagpur line

Trains
 Howrah Rajdhani Express
 Howrah - Bhopal Weekly Express

Municipal entities
 Howrah Municipal Corporation
 Howrah Municipal Corporation Stadium
 Howrah Police Commissionerate

Other
 Howrah (ship), a ship of the 19th century
 Howrah, Tasmania, a suburb of Hobart, Tasmania, Australia
 Haora River, a river in India